Growing Up Is Getting Old is the second studio album by American country music singer Jason Michael Carroll. It was released on April 28, 2009 via Arista Nashville. Its lead-off single, "Where I'm From" charted in the Top 40 on the Hot Country Songs chart. The second single from the album was "Hurry Home." As with his first album, Carroll worked with producer Don Gehman.

Content
The first single from Growing Up Is Getting Old is "Where I'm From". This song made its chart debut in late 2008 and has entered Top 20 on the Billboard country singles charts. It is also the first single of his career that Carroll did not co-write, and only three of its songs were co-written by him. "Hurry Home" was released in June as the second single. The album was produced by Don Gehman, who also produced Carroll's debut, Waitin' in the Country.

Carroll and Arista Nashville parted ways in February 2010, the same month in which "Hurry Home" peaked.

Critical reception
Allmusic critic Stephen Thomas Erlewine gave the album a two-and-a-half star rating out of five. He said that Carroll's voice was "warm and friendly," but considered the lyrics to be "coldly calculated clichés," citing the presence of topics such as trucks, whiskey, bars and "dewy-eyed salutes to 'Where I'm From'." Robert Loy of Country Standard Time also gave a mostly unfavorably review, saying that the album showed a lack of artistic growth when compared to his debut, saying that except for "Sorry Don't Matter", the songs were derivative in nature. Matt Bjorke of Roughstock gave a more favorable review, saying that although the compilation "may not have a huge 'obvious' hit", he considered all of its tracks to be solid and well-sung.

Track listing

Personnel
 Kenny Aronoff - drums, percussion
 Tom Bukovac - electric guitar, piano
 Jason Michael Carroll - lead vocals
 J.T. Corenflos - electric guitar
 Wes Hightower - background vocals
 John Hobbs - Hammond organ, piano
 Mike Johnson - dobro, pedal steel guitar
 Chris McHugh - drums, percussion
 Gary Morse - dobro, pedal steel guitar
 Michael Rhodes - bass guitar
 Mike Rojas - Hammond organ, piano
 David Stallings - bird calls
 Ilya Toshinsky - banjo, acoustic guitar
 Biff Watson - banjo, acoustic guitar
 Glenn Worf - bass guitar
 Jonathan Yudkin - banjo, fiddle, mandolin, strings

Chart performance

Weekly charts

Year-end charts

Singles

References

2009 albums
Albums produced by Don Gehman
Arista Records albums
Jason Michael Carroll albums